Verner Valentine Luckin (14 February 1892 – 28 November 1931) was an English cricketer. He was a left-handed batsman who bowled leg break googly.

Luckin made his first-class debut for Hampshire in the 1910 County Championship against Somerset, where in Somerset's second innings he took 3/39.

Luckin played ten first-class matches for Hampshire up until the end of the 1912 season, with his final first-class match for the county against Middlesex. In his ten matches Luckin had no success with the bat and with the ball he took 13 wickets at a bowling average of 39.46.

After the First World War, Luckin made his debut for Warwickshire against Surrey in the 1919 County Championship. He played nine first-class matches for Warwickshire in the 1919 season, with his final first-class match for the county coming against Worcestershire. Luckin had more success with the bat for Warwickshire, scoring 195 runs at an average of 27.85, with a single half century score of 59* out against Lancashire. With the ball he took eleven wickets at a bowling average of 30.18, with best figures of 3-19.

He died at High Cross, Hampshire on 28 November 1931.

External links
Verner Luckin at Cricinfo
Verner Luckin at CricketArchive
Matches and detailed statistics for Verner Luckin

1892 births
1931 deaths
Sportspeople from Woking
People from Surrey
English cricketers
Hampshire cricketers
Warwickshire cricketers